Submarine is a novel by Joe Dunthorne. First published by Hamish Hamilton in 2008, it was adapted into a film in 2010.

Background
Published by Penguin imprint Hamish Hamilton in 2008, Submarine was Dunthorne's first novel. He wrote most of the book while studying creative writing at the University of East Anglia, where it won the university's inaugural Curtis Brown Prize. Originally a short story, Dunthorne posted the first chapter on ABCtales.com, a website that allows writers to share, discuss and develop their work.  Its popularity on the site drove him to write the full novel.

Synopsis
Submarine was marketed as "a tale of mock GCSEs, sex and death." The novel is a coming-of-age story narrated by fifteen-year-old Oliver Tate, who records with comedy and anguish his relationship with his girlfriend and his lop-sided view of the strains on his parents' marriage.

Reception
The novel was published in 2008 to critical acclaim. In 2014, it was put forward as a candidate in Wales Arts Review's search for the 'Great Welsh Novel'. Although Caradog Prichard's One Moonlit Night eventually took the accolade, reviewer Elin Williams argued that Submarine is "deservedly one of Wales’ best novels, simply because it just is Welsh. Dunthorne’s writing is engaging and well-crafted. Tate is one of the most believable Welsh protagonists I have come across; full of flaws and full of himself."

Adaptation

In 2010,  Submarine was adapted for film by Richard Ayoade. The film cast Craig Roberts as Oliver Tate, with Yasmin Paige, Noah Taylor, Paddy Considine, and Sally Hawkins in supporting roles. It premiered at the 35th Toronto International Film Festival, and was shown in London, Berlin and Swansea before going on general release in March 2011.

References

External links
Review, 6 February 2008: Nicholas Tucker, The Independent; retrieved 2 July 2017
Review, 17 February 2008: Tim Adams, The Guardian; retrieved 2 July 2017  
“Submarine” at goodreads.com
“Submarine” at Penguin Books

English novels
Hamish Hamilton books
2008 British novels
British bildungsromans
British novels adapted into films